Grandview Independent School District is a public school district based in Grandview, Texas (USA).

Located in southern Johnson County, a small portion of the district extends into northern Hill County.

In 2009, the school district was rated "recognized" by the Texas Education Agency. The elementary was named a National Blue Ribbon School in 2015.

Schools
Grandview High School (Grades 9-12)
Grandview Junior High School (Grades 6-8)
Grandview Elementary School (Grades PK-5)

References

External links
Grandview ISD

School districts in Johnson County, Texas
School districts in Hill County, Texas